Laki Shah Saddar railway station is located in  Pakistan. Its old name was 'Tirath Laki'.

Laki Shah Saddar is a small town situated on the right bank of the Indus River, beautifully walled by the Kirthar Mountains range on the west side. This small town has two ways of connections to the rest of country; Indus Highway and single track Pakistan Railways. There is a government rest house near the station.

Other prominent feature of this town is its largely spread area of cemetery, some sources claim that Laki Shah Saddar graveyard is the second largest cemetery in Pakistan after Makli graveyard (Makli Necropolis) in Thatta district, Sindh. The Laki Shah Saddar cemetery buries people from pre-historic dynasties to modern age common people of adjacent areas. It is worth to note that many of the graves and tombs existing here are a real piece of art, but having no recorded history, even no serious effort is so far made to research and explore hidden dimensions of the cemetery. A big number of religious figures are also laid to rest in this cemetery. The most prominent is Shah Saddarudin, he came to South Asia in order to avoid the persecution by Abbasids rulers in old Iraq. He is believed to be a person from 8th generation of Imam Musa Kazim, the 7th Imam according to Shia sect of Islam. Shah Saddar"s shrine is a famous place for many people of Pakistan who regularly come there to pay their respect and prayers..

Historically, Laki Shah Saddar has rich culture and history of having sound and viable past in terms of trade and commerce. Like many other cities and towns in  Pakistan, Laki Shah Saddar was a very open and secular town before the partition of British India in Pakistan and India in 1947. Even today there are many pre-partition buildings which speak volumes of one of the most organised and civilized community living in Laki Shah Saddar before the partition.

See also
 Lakki hills
 List of railway stations in Pakistan
 Pakistan Railways

References

External links

Railway stations in Sindh
Railway stations on Kotri–Attock Railway Line (ML 2)